GCZ Stadium or Gymnastic Club Zenon Stadium (Γ.Σ.Ζ.) is a multi-purpose stadium in Larnaca, Cyprus. Usually it is referred to as the 'neo GSZ Stadium' to distinguish it from the old GSZ Stadium, which it replaced. It is currently used mostly for football matches and was the home ground of AEK Larnaca FC until 2016. The stadium holds 13,032 people. Its owner is the Gymnastic Club Zeno which took its name from the native philosopher of Larnaca Zeno of Citium. Before the merge of Pezoporikos and EPA Larnaca into the new football club AEK Larnaca FC, it was also the home of those two clubs.

In 2006 it hosted the Cypriot Cup final between APOEL and AEK Larnaca FC, where APOEL won 3–2. However the greatest event that was hosted in the Larnaca Stadium was the final for the 1998 UEFA European Under-18 Football Championship between Republic of Ireland and Germany where they tied 1-1.  The Republic of Ireland beat Germany 4–3 on penalties and won the trophy. During the same day, the Third Position final playoff was played for the same tournament and in that match Portugal beat Croatia 5–4 on penalties as well while the match ended 0-0.

References

Athletics (track and field) venues in Cyprus
Football venues in Cyprus
Multi-purpose stadiums in Cyprus
Sport in Larnaca
Pezoporikos Larnaca
Buildings and structures in Larnaca